The 1984 World Series was the championship series of Major League Baseball's (MLB) 1984 season. The 81st edition of the World Series, it was a best-of-seven playoff played between the American League (AL) champion Detroit Tigers and the National League (NL) champion San Diego Padres. The Tigers won the series, four games to one. This was the city of Detroit's first sports championship since the Tigers themselves won the 1968 World Series.

This was the first World Series that Peter Ueberroth presided over as commissioner.  Ueberroth began his tenure on October 1, succeeding Bowie Kuhn. Ueberroth had been elected as Kuhn's successor prior to the 1984 season, but did not take over until the postseason as he was serving as the chairman of the 1984 Summer Olympics, which ran from July 28 through August 12.

This was the last World Series in which the designated hitter was used for games played in an NL team's ballpark in the World Series (as in even-numbered years, the DH would be used in all games, which was first instituted in 1976) until MLB's adoption of a universal DH in 2022. The next World Series did not use the DH (as odd-numbered years saw the DH rule not in force for the World Series). From 1986 until 2021, the DH would only be used in games played at the AL representative's park.

Background

The San Diego Padres won the National League West division by 12 games over both the Atlanta Braves and the Houston Astros, then defeated the Chicago Cubs, three games to two, in the National League Championship Series.  The Detroit Tigers won the American League East division by 15 games over the Toronto Blue Jays, then swept the Kansas City Royals, three games to none, in the American League Championship Series.

The World Series was scheduled to start in the National League park. But Major League Baseball actually had a contingency plan to change things and start the World Series in the American League park in the event that the Cubs won the NLCS. This would have allowed the Wrigley Field (i.e. daytime) games to be over the weekend such that the only lost prime time game would have been on Friday, October 12.

The 1984 World Series was a rematch between managers Sparky Anderson (Detroit) and Dick Williams (San Diego). The two had previously faced off in the 1972 World Series, with Anderson managing the Cincinnati Reds and Williams helming the victorious Oakland Athletics. The 1984 Series was Anderson's fifth overall as a manager—in addition to the 1972 Fall Classic, he had also managed the Reds during the 1970 World Series (which they lost to the Baltimore Orioles) and served as skipper during Cincinnati's back-to-back world championships in 1975 and 1976. Anderson's counterpart, Williams, was managing in his fourth World Series; he had headed the Boston Red Sox during the 1967 "Impossible Dream" season, when they won their first pennant in 21 years in a tight race over the Tigers, Minnesota Twins, and Chicago White Sox. After his Athletics won the 1972 World Series, Williams again led them to victory in the 1973 Series over the New York Mets.

Prior to 1984, only three managers (Joe McCarthy, Al Dark and Yogi Berra) had won pennants in both leagues. Nobody had ever won World Series as a manager in both leagues, thus ensuring that the winning manager of the 1984 Series would be the first to do so.

The 1984 World Series was also a battle of sorts between the multimillion-dollar American fast food chains. Domino's Pizza founder Tom Monaghan owned the Tigers while McDonald's founder Ray Kroc, who died several months before the 1984 World Series, owned the Padres. The series was informally known as the "Fast Food Fall Classic". It would feature the first World Series game at Jack Murphy Stadium (Game 1) and the final World Series game at Tiger Stadium (Game 5).

Detroit Tigers

By May 24, 1984, the Detroit Tigers had just won their ninth straight game with Jack Morris on the mound winning his ninth game of the season.  The Tigers record stood at 35–5, a major league record.  In the next three games they would get swept by the Seattle Mariners and settle down to play .500 ball over the next 40 games. But in the end, they would wind up with a franchise record 104 wins and become only the third team in MLB history to lead the league wire-to-wire.

These Tigers were strong up the middle featuring all-stars at each middle position with catcher Lance Parrish setting a career high in home runs with 33, the record-setting tandem of Lou Whitaker at second base and Alan Trammell at shortstop (they played together from 1977–95) and solid center-fielder Chet Lemon.  In addition to Morris, the pitching staff was anchored by starters Dan Petry and Milt Wilcox, with eventual Cy Young Award and Most Valuable Player winner, Willie Hernández (9–3, 1.92 ERA, 32 saves), closing.

The Detroit Tigers signed ageless wonder free-agent Darrell Evans (their first free-agent signing since Tito Fuentes in 1977) prior to the season, and acquired first baseman Dave Bergman in a trade with the Philadelphia Phillies that also brought them the aforementioned Hernández.  Bergman would settle in as the Tigers' everyday first baseman providing steady glove-work.  And of course there was "Mr. Clutch", right-fielder Kirk Gibson, who had a break-out year with 27 home runs, 29 stolen bases, 91 RBIs, and a .282 batting average.

After winning two World Championships with the 1975–76 Cincinnati Reds, manager Sparky Anderson was primed to win his first in the American League in his fifth full season with the Detroit Tigers. Anderson had proved to be somewhat prophetic, as he had made a bold statement in mid-1979 when he joined the Tigers that his team would be a pennant winner within five years.

San Diego Padres

Williams was in his third season with the San Diego Padres after leading them to identical 81–81 (.500) records in 1982 and 1983.  1984 would mark only the second time in Padre history that the team would finish over .500, the other being an 84–78 record in 1978. With the Padres' NL pennant in 1984, Williams became the second manager to take three teams to the World Series (he had previously taken the 1967 Red Sox and the 1972 and 1973 Athletics to the Fall Classic).

The Padres set a franchise record for victories with 92 in 1984, being led by two veterans, first baseman Steve Garvey and third baseman Graig Nettles.  Statistically, this team was not overwhelming, with Nettles and Kevin McReynolds leading the team with just 20 home runs.  (The team eventually would lose McReynolds in Game 4 of the NLCS due to a broken wrist.)  No player came close to 100 RBIs (Garvey, 86) or had over 30 doubles in the regular season, although Tony Gwynn won the first of his eight National League batting titles by hitting for a .351 average with 213 hits.

The pitching staff was average—a staff of twentysomethings and a 33-year-old closer, Goose Gossage (10–6, 25 SVs), who was signed as a free agent from the New York Yankees.  Eric Show led the staff with 15 wins with Ed Whitson and lefty Mark Thurmond having identical 14–8 records.  But the sterling bullpen, headed by Gossage and Craig "Lefty" Lefferts, held the staff together enough to take this team to the "Big Show" although they would falter and get ripped by the Tiger bats losing the Series in five games.

To get to the Series, the Padres had to overcome a two-games-to-none deficit against the Chicago Cubs in the NLCS, rallying to win the final three games.  The 1984 Padres adopted Ray Parker Jr.'s "Ghostbusters" as their theme song (à la the 1979 Pittsburgh Pirates using Sister Sledge's "We Are Family" as their theme song).  During their playoff series against the Chicago Cubs, the Padre fans turned Ghostbusters into Cubbusters.

Summary

Matchups

Game 1

The Tigers struck first in Game 1 when Lou Whitaker doubled to lead off the top of the first and scored on Alan Trammell's single but their starter Jack Morris (a 19-game winner during the season) struggled in the bottom half, as he surrendered two-out singles to Steve Garvey and Graig Nettles, followed by a two-run double to Terry Kennedy.  Padre starter Mark Thurmond took a 2–1 lead into the fifth, but then surrendered a crucial two-out, two-run homer to Larry Herndon. Nettles and Kennedy both singled to open the San Diego sixth, but Morris snuffed out their momentum by striking out the rest of the side. Kurt Bevacqua started what looked to be a comeback with a leadoff double in the seventh, but was thrown out at third while attempting to stretch the hit into a triple. Despite the close call, Morris remained focused and set down the last nine remaining Padre batters for a complete game, 3–2 victory.

Game 2

In Game 2, Lou Whitaker, Alan Trammell and Kirk Gibson hit consecutive singles to lead off the top of the first and put the Tigers up 1–0. After Gibson stole second, Trammell scored on Lance Parrish's sacrifice fly, then Darrell Evans's RBI single made it 3–0 Tigers. Padre starter Ed Whitson was pulled after just  innings. In the bottom of the inning, the Padres cut the lead to 3–1 on Graig Nettles's sacrifice fly, then in the fourth, Bobby Brown's RBI groundout made it 3–2 Tigers. Kurt Bevacqua then evened the series at 1–1 with a three-run home run in the fifth-inning off Dan Petry.  To date, this remains the only World Series victory in Padres history. Andy Hawkins earned the win with  shutout innings while Craig Lefferts pitched a three-inning save.

Game 2 at Jack Murphy Stadium marked the last MLB playoff game until the introduction of the universal DH in 2022 where the DH was used in a National League ballpark. Before this, any World Series game in an American League park used the DH (previously, the DH was used in alternating World Series), while pitchers batted in the NL parks. The next time the DH rule was used in a National League park was during a regular season series between the Toronto Blue Jays and Philadelphia Phillies during the 2010 season.

Game 3

By the time the 1984 World Series rolled around, Tiger Stadium (built in 1912) became the oldest ballpark to ever host a World Series game.

Tim Lollar failed to make it out of the second inning as Detroit erupted for four runs. Chet Lemon singled with one out, then with two outs, Marty Castillo's home run made it 2–0 Tigers. Lou Whitaker then walked and scored on Alan Trammell's double. A walk and single loaded the bases before Greg Booker relieved Lollar and walked Larry Herndon to force in another run. The Padres got on the board in the third when back-to-back leadoff singles off of Milt Wilcox was followed by an RBI groundout by Steve Garvey, but in the bottom of the inning, Booker walked three to load the bases with two outs. Greg Harris in relief hit Kirk Gibson with a pitch to force in the Tigers' last run. The Padres scored their last run in the seventh on Graig Nettles's sacrifice fly with runners on second and third off of Bill Scherrer. Willie Hernández pitched  innings of one-hit relief for the save. The 5–2 victory gave the Tigers a two games-to-one series lead.

Game 4

Alan Trammell drilled a pair of two-run homers in the first and third innings to account for all of Detroit's offense as the Tigers beat Eric Show to take a three games-to-one lead in the Series. Jack Morris got his second Series victory in another complete-game effort, allowing two runs on Terry Kennedy's home run in the second and a wild pitch in the ninth to Kennedy that scored Steve Garvey, and five hits.

Game 5

For the fourth consecutive game, the Padres' starting pitcher did not make it past the third inning, as the Tigers jumped on Mark Thurmond for three runs in the first inning. Lou Whitaker singled to lead off, then Kirk Gibson homered an out later, followed by consecutive singles by Lance Parrish, Larry Herndon and Chet Lemon. The Padres got on the board in the third when Bobby Brown hit a leadoff single off of Dan Petry, moved to third on two groundouts and scored on Steve Garvey's single. The Padres rallied to tie the score in the fourth when with runners on second and third Brown's sacrifice fly and Alan Wiggins's RBI single scored a run each to knock Petry out of the game, but the Tigers loaded the bases in the fifth off of Andy Hawkins when Rusty Kuntz's sacrifice fly put them up 4–3. Parrish's home run in the seventh off of Rich Gossage made it 5–3 Tigers, but the Padres cut the lead back to one on Kurt Bevacqua's home run off closer Willie Hernández. Kirk Gibson came to the plate in the bottom of the eighth for the Tigers with runners on second and third and one out. Gibson had homered earlier in the game, and Padres manager Dick Williams strolled to the mound to talk to Goose Gossage, seemingly with the purpose of ordering him to walk Gibson intentionally. Just before the at-bat, Gibson made a US$10 bet (flashing ten fingers) with his manager Sparky Anderson that Gossage (who had dominated Gibson in the past) would pitch to him. Gossage talked Williams into letting him pitch to Gibson, and Gibson responded with a three-run blast into the upper deck to clinch the Series for the Tigers. Gibson wound up driving in five runs and scoring three, including the run that gave Detroit the lead for good when he raced home on a pop-up sacrifice fly by little-used reserve Rusty Kuntz.

In the ninth, Willie Hernández closed out the series for the Tigers by getting Tony Gwynn to fly to Larry Herndon in left field for the final out.

While Alan Trammell won the Sport Magazine variation of the World Series Most Valuable Player Award (the official one), Jack Morris won the Babe Ruth Award from the New York City chapter of the Baseball Writers' Association of America.

After being fired by the Cincinnati Reds in 1978, Sparky Anderson was hired by the Tigers in June 1979.

Composite box
1984 World Series (4–1): Detroit Tigers (A.L.) over San Diego Padres (N.L.)

Records
Three players set or tied World Series hitting records for a five-game World Series during the 1984 World Series.  Series MVP Alan Trammell tied a record by collecting nine total hits, while teammate Lou Whitaker tied another record by scoring six runs.  The Padres' Carmelo Martinez set a record by striking out nine times. Each of these records still stands, .

Notes

See also
 1984 Japan Series

References
Neft, David S., and Richard M. Cohen. The World Series. 1st ed. New York: St Martins, 1990. (Neft and Cohen 402–406)

External links

1984 NLCS |Game 5 at MLB.com
1984 ALCS |Game 3 at MLB.com
Detroit Jumped All Over 'Em at SI.com
Baseball's Greatest Teams: 1984 Detroit Tigers at baseballlibrary.com
1984 Detroit Tigers: Day-by-Day Summary at baseballlibrary.com
1984 San Diego Padres: Day-by-Day Summary at baseballlibrary.com
Twenty years ago, Padres concocted cohesive crew for run at World Series

World Series
World Series
Detroit Tigers postseason
San Diego Padres postseason
World Series
World Series
1984 in Detroit
1980s in San Diego
October 1984 sports events in the United States
Baseball competitions in Detroit
Baseball competitions in San Diego